In set theory, AD+ is an extension, proposed by W. Hugh Woodin, to the axiom of determinacy. The axiom, which is to be understood in the context of ZF plus DCR (the axiom of dependent choice for real numbers), states two things:
 Every set of reals is ∞-Borel.
 For any ordinal λ less than Θ, any subset A of ωω, and any continuous function π:λω→ωω, the preimage π−1[A] is determined. (Here  λω is to be given the product topology, starting with the discrete topology on λ.)

The second clause by itself is referred to as ordinal determinacy.

See also
 Axiom of projective determinacy
 Axiom of real determinacy
 Suslin's problem
 Topological game

References

Axioms of set theory
Determinacy